Joshua Lanier Martin (December 5, 1799November 2, 1856) was an American Democratic Party politician who served (as an Independent) as the 12th Governor of the U.S. state of Alabama from 1845 to 1847. He also served as a representative to the United States Congress for Alabama's 2nd district from 1835 to 1839.

He was born on December 5, 1799, in Blount County, Tennessee. He taught school during his youth years and studied law in Maryville, Tennessee; then, he moved to Alabama in 1819 to continue his studies. He passed the bar and began legal practice in Athens, Alabama. He was known as an ardent Democrat. Before serving the state of Alabama as its governor, he served as a legislator, solicitor, circuit judge, and congressman. He was first elected to Congress as part of the 24th Congress and a member of the Jacksonian Party. However, he changed parties to the Democratic Party when elected to the 25th Congress. In 1845 he opposed other Democratic leaders and ran as an independent for governor, defeating the mainstream Democratic candidate, and Democrats never forgave him for his action. However, he denied the Whig Party any chance it might have had to win office that year. During his term of office, the state capitol was moved from Tuscaloosa, Alabama to its current location in Montgomery, Alabama. His tenure also saw the US declare war on the Republic of Mexico. As governor, Martin saw the state bank's dissolution, which he had perceived as crooked. Although he initially ran for reelection in 1847, he withdrew his name from consideration. After his term as governor, he returned to law practice in Tuscaloosa, Alabama, but did serve one more term in the state legislature in 1853. He never lost an election for public office. Martin died in 1856 in Tuscaloosa, Alabama, at 56.

References

External links

National Governors Foundation
 "Joshua Martin." Birmingham, Alabama Wiki ("Bham Wiki") (online), http://www.bhamwiki.com/w/Joshua_Martin.
 Bailey, Hugh C. "Joshua L. Martin (1845-47)",  Encyclopedia of Alabama (online). http://www.encyclopediaofalabama.org/article/h-2005#sthash.v3yR0otQ.dpuf.

1799 births
1856 deaths
People from Blount County, Tennessee
Governors of Alabama
Democratic Party members of the Alabama House of Representatives
Members of the United States House of Representatives from Alabama
Alabama Jacksonians
Independent state governors of the United States
Democratic Party governors of Alabama
Alabama Independents